Carp are various species of oily freshwater fish from the family Cyprinidae, a very large group of fish native to Europe and Asia. While carp is consumed in many parts of the world, they are generally considered an invasive species in parts of Africa, Australia and most of the United States.

Biology
The cypriniformes (family Cyprinidae) are traditionally grouped with the Characiformes, Siluriformes, and Gymnotiformes to create the superorder Ostariophysi, since these groups share some common features. These features include being found predominantly in fresh water and possessing Weberian ossicles, an anatomical structure derived from the first five anterior-most vertebrae, and their corresponding ribs and neural crests.

The third anterior-most pair of ribs is in contact with the extension of the labyrinth and the posterior with the swim bladder. The function is poorly understood, but this structure is presumed to take part in the transmission of vibrations from the swim bladder to the labyrinth and in the perception of sound, which would explain why the Ostariophysi have such a great capacity for hearing.

Most cypriniformes have scales and teeth on the inferior pharyngeal bones which may be modified in relation to the diet. Tribolodon is the only cyprinid genus which tolerates salt water. Several species move into brackish water but return to fresh water to spawn. All of the other cypriniformes live in continental waters and have a wide geographical range. Some consider all cyprinid fishes carp, and the family Cyprinidae itself is often known as the carp family.

In colloquial use,  carp usually refers only to several larger cyprinid species such as Cyprinus carpio (common carp), Carassius carassius (Crucian carp), Ctenopharyngodon idella (grass carp), Hypophthalmichthys molitrix (silver carp), and Hypophthalmichthys nobilis (bighead carp).

Carp have long been an important food fish to humans. Several species such as the various goldfish breeds and the domesticated common carp variety known as koi have been popular ornamental fishes. As a result, carp have been introduced to various locations, though with mixed results. Several species of carp are considered invasive species in the United States, and, worldwide, large sums of money are spent on carp control.

At least some species of carp are able to survive for months with practically no oxygen (for example under ice or in stagnant, scummy water) by metabolizing glycogen to form lactic acid which is then converted into ethanol and carbon dioxide. The ethanol diffuses into the surrounding water through the gills.

Species

Recreational fishing

In 1653 Izaak Walton wrote in The Compleat Angler, "The Carp is the queen of rivers; a stately, a good, and a very subtle fish; that was not at first bred, nor hath been long in England, but is now naturalised."

Carp are variable in terms of angling value.
 In Europe, even when not fished for food, they are eagerly sought by anglers, being considered highly prized coarse fish that are difficult to hook. The UK has a thriving carp angling market. It is the fastest growing angling market in the UK, and has spawned a number of specialised carp angling publications such as Carpology, Advanced carp fishing, Carpworld and Total Carp, and informative carp angling web sites, such as "Carpfishing UK".
 In the United States, carp are also classified as a rough fish, as well as a damaging naturalized exotic species, but with sporting qualities. Carp have long suffered from a poor reputation in the United States as undesirable for angling or for the table, especially since they are typically an invasive species out-competing more desirable local game fish.  Nonetheless, many states' departments of natural resources are beginning to view the carp as an angling fish instead of a maligned pest. Groups such as Wild Carp Companies, American Carp Society, and the Carp Anglers Group promote the sport and work with fisheries departments to organize events to introduce and expose others to the unique opportunity the carp offers freshwater anglers.

Aquaculture

Various species of carp have been domesticated and reared as food fish across Europe and Asia for thousands of years. These various species appear to have been domesticated independently, as the various domesticated carp species are native to different parts of Eurasia. Aquaculture has been pursued in China for at least 2,400 years. A tract by Fan Li in the fifth century BC details many of the ways carp were raised in ponds. The common carp, Cyprinus carpio, is originally from Central Europe.  Several carp species (collectively known as Asian carp) were domesticated in East Asia. Carp that are originally from South Asia, for example catla (Gibelion catla), rohu (Labeo rohita) and mrigal (Cirrhinus cirrhosus), are known as Indian carp. Their hardiness and adaptability have allowed domesticated species to be propagated all around the world.

Although the carp was an important aquatic food item, as more fish species have become readily available for the table, the importance of carp culture in Western Europe has diminished. Demand has declined, partly due to the appearance of more desirable table fish such as trout and salmon through intensive farming, and environmental constraints. However, fish production in ponds is still a major form of aquaculture in Central and Eastern Europe, including the Russian Federation, where most of the production comes from low or intermediate-intensity ponds. In Asia, the farming of carp continues to surpass the total amount of farmed fish volume of intensively sea-farmed species, such as salmon and tuna.

Breeding
Selective breeding programs for the common carp include improvement in growth, shape, and resistance to disease. Experiments carried out in the USSR used crossings of broodstocks to increase genetic diversity, and then selected the species for traits such as growth rate, exterior traits and viability, and/or adaptation to environmental conditions such as variations in temperature. selected carp for fast growth and tolerance to cold, the Ropsha carp. The results showed a 30 to 77.4% improvement of cold tolerance, but did not provide any data for growth rate. An increase in growth rate was observed in the second generation in Vietnam, Moav and Wohlfarth (1976) showed positive results when selecting for slower growth for three generations compared to selecting for faster growth. Schaperclaus (1962) showed resistance to the dropsy disease wherein selected lines suffered low mortality (11.5%) compared to unselected (57%).

The major carp species used traditionally in Chinese aquaculture are the black, grass, silver and bighead carp. In the 1950s, the Pearl River Fishery Research Institute in China made a technological breakthrough in the induced breeding of these carps, which has resulted in a rapid expansion of freshwater aquaculture in China. In the late 1990s, scientists at the Chinese Academy of Fishery Sciences developed a new variant of the common carp called the Jian carp. This fish grows rapidly and has a high feed conversion rate. Over 50% of the total aquaculture production of carp in China has now converted to Jian carp.

As ornamental fish

Carp, along with many of their cyprinid relatives, are popular ornamental aquarium and pond fish.

Ornamental goldfish (Carassius auratus) were originally domesticated from their wild form, a dark greyish-brown carp native to Asia, but may have been influenced by Carassius carassius and Carassius gibelio. They were first bred for color in China over a thousand years ago. Due to selective breeding, goldfish have been developed into many distinct breeds, and are found in various colors, color patterns, forms and sizes far different from those of the original carp. Goldfish were kept as ornamental fish in China for thousands of years before being introduced to Japan in 1603, and to Europe in 1611.

Koi are a domesticated varieties of common carp (Cyprinus carpio) and Amur carp (Cyprinus rubrofuscus) that have been selectively bred for color. The common carp was introduced from China to Japan, where selective breeding in the 1820s in the Niigata region resulted in koi. In Japanese culture, koi are treated with affection, and seen as good luck. They are popular in other parts of the world as outdoor pond fish.

As food

 Bighead carp is enjoyed in many parts of the world, but it has not become a popular foodfish in North America. Acceptance there has been hindered in part by the name "carp", and its association with the common carp which is not a generally favored foodfish in North America. The flesh of the bighead carp is white and firm, different from that of the common carp, which is darker and richer. Bighead carp flesh does share one unfortunate similarity with common carp flesh – both have intramuscular bones within the filet. However, bighead carp captured from the wild in the United States tend to be much larger than common carp, so the intramuscular bones are also larger and thus less problematic.
 Common carp, breaded and fried, is part of traditional Christmas Eve dinner in Slovakia, Poland, eastern part of Croatia and in the Czech Republic. In pond based water agriculture it is treated as most prominent food fish.
 Crucian carp is considered the best-tasting pan fish in Poland. In Russia, this particular species is called , meaning "golden crucian", and is one of the fish used in a borscht recipe called  or  ).
 Mud carp, due to the low cost of production, is mainly consumed by the poor, locally; it is mostly sold alive, but can be dried and salted. The fish is sometimes canned or processed as fish cakes, fish balls, or dumplings. They can be found for retail sale within China.
 Chinese mud carp is an important food fish in Guangdong Province. It is also cultured in this area and Taiwan. Cantonese and Shunde cuisines often use this fish to make fish balls and dumplings. It can be served cooked with vegetables such as Chinese cabbage.

List of carp-based dishes 
 Fisherman's soup
 Kuai
 Taramosalata
 Masgouf, a popular Iraqi dish consisting of seasoned, grilled carp
 Gefilte fish, an Ashkenazi Jewish dish made from a poached mixture of ground deboned fish, primarily carp, whitefish, and pike

See also
 Asian carp in Chinese culture
 Oily fish
 Rough fish
 Invasive species

References

External links

 
 
 

 
Commercial fish
Fish common names
Fish of Europe
Fish of East Asia
Fish of Southeast Asia
Fishkeeping
Oily fish
Sport fish